Agios Charalampos is a village in the Ellispontos municipal unit, Kozani regional unit, Greece.

References

Populated places in Kozani (regional unit)